The 2018 Christy Ring Cup was the 14th staging of the Christy Ring Cup hurling championship since its establishment by the Gaelic Athletic Association in 2005. It is the third tier of senior inter-county hurling. The competition began on 12 May 2018 and ended on 23 June 2018.

Carlow were the 2017 champions, beating Antrim in the final. Both teams were included in the counties competing in the newly created Joe McDonagh Cup. Roscommon lost their play-off match against Mayo in 2017 – normally Roscommon would have been relegated but they remained in the 2018 Christy Ring Cup as a result of the restructuring of the hurling championship tiers.

Kildare were the 2018 Chrisy Ring champions, defeating London by 3-19 to 1-11 in the final. Kildare lost the relegation/promotion game against Antrim and remained in the Christy Ring Cup for 2019.

Team changes

To Championship 
Relegated from the All-Ireland Senior Hurling Championship

 None

Promoted from the Nicky Rackard Cup

 Armagh
 Derry

From Championship 
Promoted to the Joe McDonagh Cup

 Antrim
 Carlow

Relegated to the Nicky Rackard Cup

 None

Format

Beginning in 2018, the Christy Ring Cup changed to an initial stage of two groups of four teams. Previously it was a double elimination tournament. The top two teams from both groups advance to the semi-finals. In 2018, teams at the bottom of each group will automatically be relegated to the Nicky Rackard Cup for 2019. In subsequent years, the bottom teams will meet in a relegation playoff to decide the one team relegated to the following year's Nicky Rackard Cup.

The Christy Ring champions contest a promotion/relegation playoff with the second bottom team in the Joe McDonagh Cup with the winner earning the right to compete in the 2019 Joe McDonagh Cup.

Following the creation of the Joe McDonagh Cup in 2018, the Christy Ring Cup was reclassified as tier 3 (it was previously tier 2).

Group stage

Group 1

Group 1 Table

{| class="wikitable" style="text-align:center"
!width=20|
!width=150 style="text-align:left;"|Team
!width=20|
!width=20|
!width=20|
!width=20|
!width=50|
!width=50|
!width=20|
!width=20|
!Qualification 
|- style="background:#ccffcc"
|1||align=left| Kildare||3||3||0||0||89||58||31||6
| rowspan="2" |Advance to Knockout Stage
|- style="background:#ccffcc"
|2||align=left| Wicklow||3||2||0||1||72||64||8||4
|- 
|3||align=left| Roscommon ||3||1||0||2||48||71||-22||2
|
|- style="background:#ffcccc" 
|4||align=left| Mayo||3||0||0||3||46||63||-17||0
|Relegation to Nicky Rackard Cup
|}

Group 1 Rounds 1 to 3

Group 1 Round 1

Group 1 Round 2

Group 1 Round 3

Group 2

Group 2 Table

{| class="wikitable" style="text-align:center"
!width=20|
!width=150 style="text-align:left;"|Team
!width=20|
!width=20|
!width=20|
!width=20|
!width=50|
!width=50|
!width=20|
!width=20|
!Qualification 
|- style="background:#ccffcc"
|1||align=left| London||3||2||0||1||88||60||28||4
| rowspan="2" |Advance to Knockout Stage
|- style="background:#ccffcc" 
|2||align=left| Derry ||3||2||0||1||89||65||24||4
|-
|3||align=left| Down||3||2||0||1||92||69||23||4
|
|- style="background:#ffcccc" 
|4||align=left| Armagh||3||0||0||3||39||114||-75||0
|Relegation to Nicky Rackard Cup
|}

London, Derry and Down all finished on 4 points and were ranked on score difference.

Group 2 Rounds 1 to 3

Group 2 Round 1

{{football box collapsible
|date = 12 May 2018
|time = 1:00 pm
|round = Round 1
|team1 =  Derry
|score = 1-18 - 1-20
|report = Report
|team2 =  London|goals1 = C O'Doherty 0-11 (9fs), S McGuigan 1-0, N Waldron 0-3, C McKaigue 0-2, M McGuigan, C Waldron 0-1.
|goals2 = A Sheehan 0-10 (6fs), K O'Loughlin 1-2, R Murphy 0-3 (2fs), K Reid, F Collins, H Vaughan, C Nelson, J Troy 0-1 each. 
|stadium = Dean McGlinchey Park, Ballinascreen
|attendance = 
|referee = J Keane (Galway)
}}

Group 2 Round 2

Group 2 Round 3

Knockout stage

Bracket

Semi-finals

The Group 1 winners play the Group 2 runners-up and the Group 2 winners play the Group 1 runners-up.

Final

Joe McDonagh/Christy Ring relegation/promotion playoffAntrim retain their place in the Joe McDonagh Cup for 2019, while Kildare''' remain in the Christy Ring Cup for 2019.

Statistics

Top scorers
Overall

Updated to 2 June 2018

In a single game

References

Christy Ring Cup
Christy Ring Cup